Dumkal Institute of Engineering & Technology (DIET), in Dumkal, Murshidabad, West Bengal, India offers degree engineering courses which are affiliated to West Bengal University of Technology (WBUT).

Course offered
 civil engineering.
 mechanical engineering.
 electrical engineering.
 computer science engineering.
 information of technology.
 electronics instrumentation and Engineering.
 electronics and communication engineering.

References

External links 

https://web.archive.org/web/20090619091259/http://www.wbut.net/
http://www.webscte.org/

Engineering colleges in West Bengal
Universities and colleges in Murshidabad district
Educational institutions established in 2001
2001 establishments in West Bengal